Catherine Salée is a Belgian actress.

Biography
From 1991 to 1994, Catherine Salée took classes at the Royal Conservatory of Liège.

Theater

Filmography

References

External links

Living people
Belgian film actresses
Magritte Award winners
21st-century Belgian actresses
Year of birth missing (living people)
Place of birth missing (living people)